A personal information display is any device that displays user-configured information, which can be a combination of static and dynamically-generated data.  Unlike a full-blown computer, it is a small, simple Internet-connected device which consumes little power, runs silently, is highly reliable, and provides little or no opportunity for real-time user interaction.

Examples of data

User-generated static data
 to-do lists
 reminders
 electronic sticky notes

Dynamically-generated data
 news headlines
 stock quotes
 weather forecasts
 package-tracking status

Most, if not all, of the dynamically-generated data comes from RSS and other XML-based sources.

Examples of devices
The Chumby fits many of these criteria, but the Pertelian and WidgetStation displays are simpler and come closer to meeting the low-interactivity requirement of a personal information display.

See also
 Personal digital assistant
 Information appliance

Mobile computers